Fanes (Greek: Φάνες) is a village in the northeast part of Rhodes. The main village is situated around 1 km inland. Fanes has had extensive farm fields, near the coast and along the adjacent hills. It also has a small natural bay which was refitted as a yacht port in the 1990s.  Since 1998, Fanes has formed part of the Municipality of Kameiros (Kamiros) — named after the ancient Doric city.

Populated places in Rhodes